A list of urban parks by size includes parks at least  or  and contained entirely within a locality's municipal or metropolitan boundary.

List

This is a list of the largest parks located entirely within a metropolitan area. Park systems are included, but not ranked because park systems are networks that contain multiple parks. Not all parks listed below are classified as urban parks by their managing authority.

See also
 Urban parks in Canada

References

Footnotes

Citations

Urban Parks
 Urban